Nomeus gronovii, the man-of-war fish or bluebottle fish, is a species of fish in the family Nomeidae, the driftfish. It is notable for its ability to live within the deadly tentacles of a siphonophore, the Portuguese man o' war, upon whose tentacles and gonads it feeds. The fish is striped with blackish-blue blemishes covering its body, and the caudal fin is extremely forked. It is of minor importance to commercial fisheries. This species is the only known member of its genus.

Toxin avoidance
Rather than using mucus to prevent nematocysts from firing, as is seen in some of the clownfish sheltering among sea anemones, the fish appears to use highly agile swimming to physically avoid tentacles.

The fish has a very high number of vertebrae (41), which may add to its agility and primarily uses its pectoral fins for swimming—a feature of fish that specialize in maneuvering tight spaces. It also has a complex skin design and at least one antigen to the man o' war's toxin. Although the fish seems to be 10 times more resistant to the toxin than other fish, it can be stung by the dactylozooides (large tentacles), which it actively avoids. The smaller gonozooids do not seem to sting the fish and the fish is reported to frequently "nibble" on these tentacles.

Naming
The specific name honours the Dutch zoologist Laurentius Theodorus Gronovius (1730-1777).

References

Nomeidae
Monotypic fish genera
Fish described in 1789
Taxa named by Johann Friedrich Gmelin
Fish of the Atlantic Ocean